Chiusano may refer to:

Places
Chiusano d'Asti, Italian municipality in the Province of Asti
Chiusano di San Domenico, Italian municipality in the Province of Avellino

People
Felice Chiusano, Italian singer member of Quartetto Cetra
Italo Alighiero Chiusano, Italian writer, Germanist and journalist
Vittorio Caissotti di Chiusano, Italian lawyer, former president of Juventus F.C.